Like all municipalities of Puerto Rico, Toa Baja is subdivided into administrative units called barrios, which are roughly comparable to minor civil divisions, (and means wards or boroughs or neighborhoods in English). The barrios and subbarrios, in turn, are further subdivided into smaller local populated place areas/units called sectores (sectors in English). The types of sectores may vary, from normally sector to urbanización to reparto to barriada to residencial, among others. Some sectors appear in two barrios.

List of sectors by barrio

Candelaria

Barriada Fidel Torres
Barriada Márquez
Barriada Popular
Barriada Aponte
Comunidad Candelaria Arenas
Comunidad Pájaros
Comunidad Villa Pangola
Condominio Quinta Real
Condominio Terrazas de Montecasino
Proyecto Pájaros
Reparto Anamar
Reparto Molina
Sector Albizu
Sector Alto El Cabro
Sector Azucena
Sector Barriada Rosa
Sector Buen Vecino
Sector Capitán
Sector Dos Abras
Sector El Guayabal
Sector Fondo El Saco
Sector Gutiérrez
Sector Hoyo Frío
Sector Juan Chiquito
Sector La Prá I y II
Sector Los Díaz
Sector Los Jiménez
Sector Macún
Sector Monte Bello I y II
Sector Monte Bello
Sector Paco Dávila
Sector Villa Clemente
Sector Villa Dávila
Sector Villa Gutiérrez
Sector Villa Kennedy
Sector Villa Olga
Tramo Carretera 2
Ubanización Las Colinas
Urbanización Altagracia
Urbanización Altura de Hacienda Dorada
Urbanización Alturas de Covadonga
Urbanización Brisas de Montecasino
Urbanización Covadonga
Urbanización El Plantío
Urbanización El Rosario
Urbanización Estancias de la Fuente (Fuente Imperial, Fuente Condado y Fuente del Valle)
Urbanización Fuente Royal
Urbanización Fuentebella
Urbanización Haciendas del Norte
Urbanización Mansiones Montecasino I y II
Urbanización Quintas del Norte
Urbanización San Pedro
Urbanización San Rafael Estate
Urbanización Santa María
Urbanización y Extensión La Inmaculada

Media Luna

Brisas del Campanero II
Comunidad Las Master
Residencial Campanilla
Sector Campanilla
Sector La Vega
Sector Los Quintero
Sector Media Luna
Sector Parcelas Nuevas
Sector San José
Sector Valle Seco
Sector Villa Esperanza
Sector Villa Hostos
Urbanización Brisas del Campanero
Urbanización Riberas del Plata (Las 21)

Palo Seco
There are no sectors in Palo Seco barrio.

Sabana Seca

Calle Parcelas Nuevas
Calles: Las Marías, Sarón, Parque Oeste, Parque Norte, Parque Sur, Links, 5A, J. Link, Acueducto, Algarrobo, Higüero, La Milagrosa (Culto), León de Oro, Vargas, Bella Vista, Rejas, -F-, Progreso, Las Palmas, Iglesia Cristiana, Luz, Dolores Cruz, Vieja, Gardenia, Meléndez, Amapola
Comunidad Villa Kennedy
Comunidad Villa Marisol
Condominio Aquaparque
Condominio Century Garden
Condominio El Atlántico
Condominio Lago Vista I y II
Condominio Lagoplaya
Condominio Lagos del Norte
Condominio Parque de Las Gaviotas
Condominio Parque del Lago
Condominio Paseo Abril
Condominio Paseo Río Hondo
Cuarta Sección de Levittown
Égida Golden Age Tower
Parcelas Viejas
Primera Sección de Levittown
Quinta Sección de Levittown
Residencial Villa del Sabana
Sección Quinta A de Levittown
Sector Calle Iglesia Cristiana
Sector Camasey
Sector Campamento
Sector Cuatro Cuerdas
Sector El 26
Sector Ingenio
Sector La Franja
Sector La Furnia
Sector La Vega
Sector Los Bravos
Sector Los Magos
Sector Monserrate
Sector Propiedad Privada
Sector Punta Salinas
Sector Sabana Seca
Sector Villa Calma
Sector Villa Plebiscito
Segunda Sección de Levittown
Séptima Sección de Levittown
Sexta Sección de Levittown
Tercera Sección de Levittown
Urbanización Camino del Mar
Urbanización Campanilla
Urbanización El Naranjal
Urbanización Las Gaviotas
Urbanización Levittville
Urbanización Mansión del Mar
Urbanización Mansión del Sol
Urbanización Mansiones del Lago
Urbanización Oasis
Urbanización Pabellones
Urbanización Pradera del Norte
Urbanización Punta Salinas Park
Urbanización Rosaleda I
Urbanización Rosaleda II
Urbanización Villas de Levittown
Urbanización Villas del Naranjal
Urbanización y Extensión Lagos de Plata

Toa Baja barrio-pueblo

Residencial Ángel E. Melecio
Residencial El Toa
Urbanización Rochdale
Urbanización San Pedro
Urbanización Toa Ville

See also

 List of communities in Puerto Rico

References

Toa Baja
Toa Baja